Frank Bennett (born 3 January 1969) is an English former professional football forward.

Bennett played for Halesowen Town before joining Southampton in February 1993 for an initial fee of £10,000. He played 19 times, mainly as a substitute, and scored once against Chelsea, before joining Shrewsbury Town on loan in October 1996 and moved to Bristol Rovers the following month for a fee of £3,000.

He joined Exeter City on non-contract terms in February 2000, but left to join Forest Green Rovers the following month. He was a part of the Forest Green side that reached the 2001 FA Trophy final after he scored in a 4-1 semi final win over Hereford United at Edgar Street.

He moved to Aberystwyth Town and then followed manager Frank Gregan to Weston-super-Mare. He joined Bath City in June 2002. He struggled with injury and turned down a reduced deal in May 2004, joining Brislington in August 2004.

Bennett has a wife named Michelle, a son, Joshua, and a daughter, Shanee.

References

External links

Since 1888... The Searchable Premiership and Football League Player Database (subscription required)

1969 births
Living people
English footballers
Association football forwards
Premier League players
Halesowen Town F.C. players
Southampton F.C. players
Shrewsbury Town F.C. players
Bristol Rovers F.C. players
Exeter City F.C. players
Forest Green Rovers F.C. players
Aberystwyth Town F.C. players
Weston-super-Mare A.F.C. players
Bath City F.C. players
Brislington F.C. players